Ahmed Zouaoui ( Abu al-Abbas Ahmad ibn Abdallah az-Zawawi)  (1398 CE/800 AH – 1488 CE/884 AH) was born in Algiers. He was a theologian and Maliki Mufti of Algiers.

Teachers
Ahmed Zouaoui had the Imam Abd al-Rahman al-Tha'alibi as a guide and teacher in Malikism and Sufism.

He was also a disciple for several scholars as Al-Sakhawi and others.

Disciples
He taught several scholars as:
 Ahmad Zarruq

Works 
His works cover several aspects of the Islamic sciences, as:
 Poem in monotheism.

Citations
 Ahmad Zarruq said about his sheikh Ahmed Zouaoui:

 Al-Sakhawi said about his disciple Ahmed Zouaoui:

Poems
Ahmed Zouaoui wrote several poem lines, such as these in sufism:

See also
Muftis in Algiers
Islam in Algeria

References 

Muftis of Algiers
Algerian Sufi saints
Algerian Sufis
Algerian Maliki scholars
People from Algiers
1398 births
1488 deaths
Berber scholars
14th-century Berber people
15th-century Berber people